Cecil B. Moore, also known as Cecil B. Moore/Temple University, formerly Columbia, is a subway stop on the SEPTA Broad Street Line in  the Cecil B. Moore neighborhood in North Philadelphia, Pennsylvania. It is a local station that has four tracks, with only the outer two being served. There are separate fare control areas for northbound and southbound trains, with no crossover, and a large pavilion entrance with an escalator on the northbound side.  This is the main station serving Temple University, and therefore is one of the busiest stops on the line. Susquehanna–Dauphin station, six blocks north, also serves Temple University, although it is further from many of the main locations on campus.

Surface Transit Connections: Until February 4, 1956 - Trolley SEPTA Route 3 (now a bus line) serve as the connection.

As of June 2007, Cecil B. Moore had an average of 5,644 daily boardings.

Station layout

Gallery

See also 
 Hamilton E. Holmes station, another train station named after a civil rights leader Hamilton E. Holmes
 Martin Luther King station, a list of stations named after civil rights leader Martin Luther King Jr.

References

External links 

 Cecil B Moore Avenue entrance from Google Maps Street View

SEPTA Broad Street Line stations
Railway stations in the United States opened in 1928
Railway stations in Philadelphia
Railway stations in Pennsylvania at university and college campuses
Railway stations located underground in Pennsylvania